Rune Pedersen (born May 19, 1963) is a former football referee, representing SK Sprint-Jeløy. He was regarded as the best match official in Norway during the 1990s, and won the Kniksen award for "Referee of the year" 10 times between 1990 and 2000. Only Roy Helge Olsen stood in the way of Pedersen winning the award 10 times in a row, with his win in 1993. In the first leg of the 2000–01 UEFA Cup semi-finals between Alavés and Kaiserslautern, Pedersen awarded four penalties (three for Alavés and one for Kaiserslautern) as Alavés won 5–1. Rune Pedersen also won the Kniksen's honour award in 1998. After retiring Pedersen was the Head of Referees for the Football Association of Norway until 2014.

References

 Profile 

1963 births
Living people
People from Moss, Norway
Norwegian football referees
FIFA World Cup referees
1998 FIFA World Cup referees
Kniksen Award winners